The 2012–13 WNBL season was the 33rd season of competition since the Women's National Basketball League's establishment in 1981. A total of nine teams contested the league. The regular season was played between 5 October 2012 and 16 February 2013, followed by a post-season involving the top five on 23 February 2013 until 10 March 2013.

Broadcast rights were held by free-to-air network ABC. ABC broadcast one game a week, at 3 pm at every standard time in Australia.

Spalding provided equipment including the official game ball, with Champion supplying team apparel.

Team standings

Finals

Season award winners

Statistics leaders

References

 https://web.archive.org/web/20141227122005/http://www.wnbl.com.au/fileadmin/user_upload/Media_Guide/12284_BASKAUST_WNBL_MEDIA_GUIDE_2014-15_BACK.pdf

2010-11
2012–13 in Australian basketball
Aus
basketball
basketball